Jake Shuman "Red" Alexander (January 3, 1903 – July 28, 1969) was a politician in the state of Florida. He served in the Florida House of Representatives from 1953 to 1957, as a Democrat, representing Liberty County.

References

1969 deaths
1903 births
Democratic Party members of the Florida House of Representatives
People from Cook County, Georgia
People from Liberty County, Florida
University of Florida alumni
20th-century American politicians